Catherine Anne Goodman LVO (born 1961) is an English artist, and co-founder with King Charles III of the Royal Drawing School.

Biography
Goodman was born in London in 1961. She studied at Camberwell School of Arts and Crafts, London from 1979 to 1984, followed by the Royal Academy Schools, London from 1984 to 1987. She won the Royal Academy Gold Medal in 1987, and the BP Portrait Award at the National Portrait Gallery in 2002.

Goodman is represented by  Marlborough Fine Art  , at which she has exhibited since 2004.

She has had numerous solo exhibitions including Portraits from Life at the  National Portrait Gallery  in 2014 and the last house in the world at Marlborough Fine Art London in 2016; in 2019 she exhibited at  Hauser & Wirth  Somerset following five months as Artist in Residence, and at Marlborough Gallery New York with her solo exhibition, the light gets in. In 2021 Goodman exhibited her latest work "And everything changed' at  Marlborough Fine Art  

In 2019, the Prime Minister appointed Goodman the artist trustee of the National Gallery Goodman’s paintings are held in numerous private and public collections including the  National Portrait Gallery, which acquired her portrait of film director Stephen Frears for its 20th Century Collection; the Fitzwilliam Museum Cambridge and the Royal Collection Trust.  

Goodman sees her role as an educator as being integral to her artistic identity and in 2000 she co-established the  Royal Drawing School  with HM  King Charles III , to address the increasing absence of observational drawing in art education. She has a longstanding interest in artists’ development and education, as well as the importance of drawing skills to underpin creative practice, both in fine art disciplines and more broadly in the creative industries. 

Goodman is well known on the London art scene as the Artistic Director of  Royal Drawing School  an independent charitable art school in London's east end. 

She was appointed Lieutenant of the Royal Victorian Order (LVO) in the 2014 Birthday Honours for services to The  Royal Drawing School.

Style and influences
Goodman's paintings are figurative, in the School of London tradition, showing a strong emphasis on drawing and the physicality of paint. Her subject matter includes portraits, but also interior scenes and city landscapes. Writing on Goodman's winning entry for the 2002 BP Portrait Award at the National Portrait Gallery, a portrait of Father Antony Sutch, Headmaster of Downside School in Somerset, Elizabeth Grice described it as having, 'the quiet authority of an icon'. The portrait took two years to paint, and is typical of Goodman's methodical way of working. In her own words she is a fast painter, she spends 'a very long time on my pictures and I destroy a fair amount.'

As well as working directly from life Goodman will work from photographs, but she is an artist who places a great deal of emphasis on drawing skills. She has described this as an essential part of art,  as the means for "recreating from life a three-dimensional reality on a two-dimension space.".

References

Further reading
 Marlborough Fine Art, Two London Painters: Catherine Goodman and David Dawson (London: Marlborough Fine Art,  2004)
 Rosie Boycott, Catherine Goodman (London: Marlborough Fine Art, 2008)

External links
Marlborough Artists' Pages

1961 births
Living people
21st-century English women artists
20th-century English women artists
Alumni of Camberwell College of Arts
Alumni of the Royal Academy Schools
BP Portrait Award winners
English women painters
Modern painters
Lieutenants of the Royal Victorian Order
Painters from London
People educated at Queen's College, London